This is a list of sovereign states in the 2010s, giving an overview of states around the world during the period between 1 January 2010 and 31 December 2019. It contains 212 entries, arranged alphabetically, with information on the status and recognition of their sovereignty. It includes 195 widely recognized sovereign states, 2 associated states, and 15 entities which claim an effective sovereignty but are considered de facto constituents of other powers by the general international community.

Members or observers of the United Nations

Non-UN members or observers

Other entities
Excluded from the list above are the following noteworthy entities which either were not fully sovereign or did not claim to be independent:
  as a whole had no government and no permanent population. Seven states claims portions of Antarctica and five of these had reciprocally recognised one another's claims. These claims, which were regulated by the Antarctic Treaty System, were neither recognised nor disputed by any other signatory state.
  The European Union is a sui generis supranational organisation which had 27 (then 28) member states. The member states had transferred a measure of their legislative, executive, and judicial powers to the institutions of the EU, and as such the EU had some elements of sovereignty, without generally being considered a sovereign state. The European Union did not claim to be a sovereign state and had only limited capacity for relations with other states.
  The Sovereign Military Order of Malta is a United Nations observer. The order had bi-lateral diplomatic relations with a large number of states, but has no territory other than extraterritorial areas within Rome and Malta. The order's Constitution stated: "The Order is a subject of international law and exercises sovereign functions." Although the order frequently asserted its sovereignty, it did not claim to be a sovereign state. It lacked a defined territory. Since all its members were citizens of other states, almost all of them lived in their native countries, and those who resided in the order's extraterritorial properties in Rome did so only in connection with their official duties, the order lacked the characteristic of having a permanent population.

See also
List of sovereign states by year
List of state leaders in 2010
List of state leaders in 2011
List of state leaders in 2012
List of state leaders in 2013
List of state leaders in 2014
List of state leaders in 2015
List of state leaders in 2016
List of state leaders in 2017
List of state leaders in 2018
List of state leaders in 2019

Notes

References

2010s politics-related lists
2010-2019